Pride of Kent may refer to:
 Pride of Kent, a scrapped ferry in service under this name 1987–1998 with P&O European Ferries
 , a ferry in service under this name 2003–present with P&O Ferries

Ship names